Josceline is a given name. Notable people with the name include:

Josceline Amherst (1846–1900), member of Western Australia's first Legislative Council under responsible government
Josceline Bagot (1854–1913), English British Army officer and Conservative politician
Josceline de Bohon (1111–1184), Norman religious leader
Josceline Percy (Royal Navy officer) (1784–1856), Royal Navy officer who went on to be Commander-in-Chief
Josceline Percy, 11th Earl of Northumberland (1644–1670), of Alnwick Castle, Northumberland and Petworth House, Sussex, an English peer
Lord Josceline Percy (1811–1881), British Conservative politician
Josceline Wodehouse GCB CMG (1852–1930), senior British Army officer

See also
Joceline (name)
Joslin (disambiguation)